Cherok Tokun, sometimes spelt as Cherok To' Kun or Cherok Tok Kun, is a small town in Penang, Malaysia.

References

Populated places in Penang